Hegel's Ontology of Power: The Structure of Social Domination in Capitalism is a 2020 book by Arash Abazari in which the author tries to provide an account of Hegel's social and political philosophy focusing on Hegel's Philosophy of Right and its liberal interpretations.

Reception
The book was reviewed by Tony Smith,
Jake McNulty,
Allegra de Laurentiis, 
Nahum Brown,
and Mario Aguiriano Benéitez.
Some reviews were followed by a response by Abazari.
The book also received short reviews by Brian O'Connor and Todd Hedrick.

See also
Inventing the Market

References

External links 

2020 non-fiction books
Cambridge University Press books
English-language books
Books about Georg Wilhelm Friedrich Hegel
Books in political philosophy
Social philosophy literature
Theses
Books about capitalism
Power (social and political)